Francois Brummer (born 17 May 1989) is a South African rugby union player for  in the Pro14. His regular playing position is fly-half, although he has played fullback on occasion.

Career

Bulls / Blue Bulls

He was part of the  squad for the 2010 and 2011 Super Rugby season's although he only played in 5 matches.

Griquas

Cheetahs

Solid performances for the Griquas saw him named in the  squad for the 2013 Super Rugby season and so far he has made one appearance for the men from Bloemfontein.

Pumas / Bulls

Toyota Industries Shuttles

Brummer joined Japanese Top League side Toyota Industries Shuttles for the 2017–18 Top League season.

Zebre

He moved to Italian Pro14 side  prior to the 2018–19 season.
He played also for Zebre in 2019-20 Pro14 season.

International

Brummer played for South Africa Under-19 in the 2007 Under 19 Rugby World Championship and South Africa Under-20 in the 2008 and 2009 IRB Junior World Championships. He is the leading South African points scorer in the history of the IRB Junior World Championship.

In 2016, he was included in a South Africa 'A' squad that played a two-match series against a touring England Saxons team. He came on as a replacement in their first match in Bloemfontein and scored his side's first try within two minutes of coming on and also converted three tries, but ended on the losing side as the visitors ran out 32–24 winners. He then started the second match of the series, kicking two conversions in a 26–29 defeat to the Saxons in George.

References

Living people
1989 births
South African rugby union players
Rugby union players from Pretoria
Rugby union fly-halves
Bulls (rugby union) players
Blue Bulls players
Cheetahs (rugby union) players
Griquas (rugby union) players
South Africa Under-20 international rugby union players